The 2023 FIBA AfroCan will be the 2nd edition of the FIBA AfroCan. The tournament will be held from 8 July to 16 July 2023 and will be hosted in Angola. DR Congo are the defending champions, having won the 2019 title. The second tournament was supposed to be held in 2021, but was cancelled due to the COVID-19 pandemic.

Qualification 

The four highest ranked teams from the AfroCan 2019 were automatically qualified. Eight other teams qualified through the qualification rounds, which are held from February to June 2023.

References 

AfroCan
2023 in African basketball
FIBA
FIBA